Jedd Philo Clark Cottrill (April 15, 1832February 8, 1889) was an American lawyer, Democratic politician, and Wisconsin pioneer.  He was a member of the Wisconsin State Senate, representing northern Milwaukee County during the 1883 and 1885 sessions.

Biography
Cottrill was born on April 15, 1832, in Montpelier, Vermont. He graduated from the University of Vermont in 1852, taught school while studying law with the firm of Peck & Colby, and attained admission to the bar.  He moved to Milwaukee, Wisconsin, in 1855.

Career
Cottrill practiced law in Milwaukee.  He served as district attorney of Milwaukee County from 1865 to 1867.  He later served as a commissioner for the federal district courts in Wisconsin, and was a member of the committee appointed to organize and revise Wisconsin's statutes in 1878.  He was a member of the State Senate from 1883 to 1885.

Cottrill died of tuberculosis on February 8, 1889.  He was buried at Milwaukee's historic Forest Home Cemetery.

References

People from Montpelier, Vermont
Politicians from Milwaukee
Democratic Party Wisconsin state senators
District attorneys in Wisconsin
University of Vermont alumni
1832 births
1889 deaths
19th-century deaths from tuberculosis
19th-century American politicians
Tuberculosis deaths in Wisconsin